Vitaj! is the first album by the Slovak punk rock band Iné Kafe, released on 4 October 1998.

Track listing

Personnel
 Marek "Cibi" Cibula - vocals
 Vratko Rohoň - guitar, backing vocals
 Mario "Wayo" Praženec - bass, backing vocals
 Jozef "Dodo" Praženec - drums, backing vocals

References

1998 debut albums
Iné Kafe albums